The Sudan made its Paralympic début at the 1980 Summer Paralympics in Arnhem. The country was represented by eleven athletes competing in track and field, swimming and table tennis.

The Sudan won a single medal, when Mohamad Bashir Eltigani took gold in the men's shot put, 1B category.

This was to be the Sudan's last participation in the Paralympic Games before 2004.

See also
Sudan at the Paralympics

External links
International Paralympic Committee

References 

Nations at the 1980 Summer Paralympics
1980
Paralympics